In philosophy, fraternity or brotherhood is a kind of ethical relationship between people, which is based on love and solidarity. Fraternity is mentioned in the national motto of France, Liberté, égalité, fraternité (Liberty, equality, fraternity), and of former Yugoslavia Brotherhood and unity.

References 

Social concepts